The 1983–84 Yugoslav First Basketball League season was the 40th season of the Yugoslav First Basketball League, the highest professional basketball league in SFR Yugoslavia.

Regular season

Classification

Results 

Source:

Playoff 
Teams placed 1st to 6th at the end of the regular season automatically qualified for the playoffs quarterfinal round.

The remaining two spots for the playoffs quarterfinal round were determined through a four-team play-in. The 7th and 8th-placed teams had to play a single-game round against the Second League 2nd and 1st-placed teams, respectively, that managed to gain promotion for the next season's top league competition. Seventh-placed Partizan from the First League thus played 2nd-placed Sloga Kraljevo from the Second League. Similarly, 8th-placed Budućnost from the First League played 1st-placed Radnički Belgrade from the Second League. The winners of each respective game qualified for the playoffs quarterfinal.

PLAY-IN QUALIFYING ROUND

Radnički-Budućnost  83-66

Partizan-Sloga  99-93

QUARTERFINALS

Cibona-Radnički  101–88, 89–91, 101–89

Crvena zvezda-Partizan  93–79, 90–88

Zadar-Borac Čačak  91–83, 118–97

Šibenka-Bosna  88–94, 68–84

SEMIFINALS

Cibona-Bosna  99–89, 83–85, 77–75

Crvena zvezda-Zadar  112–90, 98–99, 112–84

FINALS 

Cibona-Crvena zvezda  78–76, 79–87, 72–71

The winning roster of Cibona:
  Mihovil Nakić
  Aleksandar Petrović
  Adnan Bečić
  Damir Pavličević
  Andro Knego
  Sven Ušić
  Rajko Gospodnetić
  Zoran Čutura
  Mladen Cetinja
  Miro Jelavić
  Marjan Nikšić
  Franjo Arapović
  Joško Vukičević
  Ivo Nakić
  Branko Vukićević

Coach:  Mirko Novosel

Qualification in 1984–85 season European competitions 

FIBA European Champions Cup
  Cibona (champions)

FIBA Cup Winners' Cup
 Bosna (Cup winners)

FIBA Korać Cup
 Crvena Zvezda (2nd)
 Zadar (3rd) 
 Šibenka (4th)
 Borac Čačak (6th)

References

Yugoslav First Basketball League seasons
Yugo
Yugo